Athanasios Prodromou (born 3 February 1994) is a Greek Paralympic athlete. He won the silver medal in the men's long jump T20 event at the 2020 Summer Paralympics held in Tokyo, Japan. A few months earlier, at the 2021 World Para Athletics European Championships in Bydgoszcz, Poland, he also won the silver medal in the men's long jump T20 event.

References

External links
 

Living people
1994 births
Place of birth missing (living people)
Greek male long jumpers
Athletes (track and field) at the 2020 Summer Paralympics
Medalists at the 2020 Summer Paralympics
Paralympic athletes of Greece
Paralympic silver medalists for Greece
Medalists at the World Para Athletics European Championships
21st-century Greek people